The Villiers 26 was a French naval seaplane which used Handley Page slats to provide the wide speed range required for escort and patrol duties. It was tested, behaved satisfactorily but received no production order.

Design
The 1928 Villiers XXIV nightfighter was the first French aircraft to use Handley Page slats and Viliers used them again in a slightly different way on their Type 26.  They provided the low speeds required for efficient ship escort work as well as high speeds for patrols, as well as almost halving the takeoff time.

Mounted on the lower fuselage with about 4° of dihedral, they were built around two box spars with spruce ribs and fabric covered. Each wing was braced from the floats by converging pairs of duralumin tubular struts to the spars at a little beyond mid-span. The leading and trailing edges of both wings were filled by duralumin-covered control surfaces, divided into two matching sections. On the outer wing, the ailerons had slats which were opened automatically by aerodynamic forces when the angle of incidence exceeded 8°; the inner flaps and slats were controlled together from a single wheel in the cockpit.

The Villiers 26's flat sided fuselage was built around four spruce longerons and plywood covered. It was powered by a  Gnome & Rhône 9A nine-cylinder radial engine, a licence-built Bristol Jupiter, mounted on a duralumin frame in the nose. Behind it, beyond a firewall, there were tanks for oil and, in the wing roots, petrol. Most of the four man crew were enclosed in a low cabin, with a windscreen just ahead of the wing leading edge. There were two pilot's seats, fitted with dual controls and behind them positions for the navigator and the radio operator. The gunner had an open cockpit behind the cabin, fitted with twin  Lewis guns on a flexible mount. At the rear the wood-framed, fabric-covered empennage was very angular, with a broad, triangular fin and a rectangular balanced rudder, its aerodynamic balance unusually beneath the fuselage. The tailplane, which was supported from below by inverted V-struts on each side, was straight-edged, small, and could be adjusted in flight. A rectangular, notched elevator was fitted with trim tabs.

These were joined to the lower fuselage by inward leaning, transverse inverted W-struts.

The Villiers 26 underwent completion at Berre-l'Étang and was complete and ready for tests before February 1930 By April it had flown, showing good characteristics on water and in the air. Nonetheless, there are no further reports of it in the French press and the following year Villiers went out of business.

Specifications

References

Bibliography

Floatplanes
1930s French patrol aircraft
Villiers aircraft